Timothy James Jeffs (born September 22, 1965) is an American musician and artist. He was born in Rockville, Maryland. He currently lives in Dumont, New Jersey with his wife Jane Jeffs and their two children.

Music career

He is a former guitarist and member of the band White Zombie, and appears on the second EP Pig Heaven Silent Explosion 1986, the five CD disk box-set Let Sleeping Corpses Lie Geffen 2008, and the vinyl Box Set "It Came from NYC" Numero Group 2016. Other members of the band were Rob Zombie, Sean Yseult, and Ivan de Prume. Jeffs was college roommates with Rob Cummings aka Rob Zombie at Parson School of Design in New York City during the 1980s. He also holds the position of being the first guitarist to play live with the band, appearing in White Zombie's debut show at CBGB's in New York City on April 28, 1986. Songs he recorded with White Zombie were: "Slaughter the Grey" which was the B side of the Pig Heaven EP, "Follow Wild", "Rain Insane", "Paradise Fireball", and "Red River Flow" which appear on "It Came from NYC" Numero Group 2016.

Art

Jeffs also creates and sells ink drawings of animals. He published a colouring book, Intricate ink: Animals in Detail, with Pomegranate Communications of Portland, Oregon in 2016. This has been followed with four more volumes, two calendars, notecards and a puzzle. His artwork has been featured in several magazines, including Colored Pencil Magazine January 2016 issue in an article titled "Creating Sea Creatures," VEUX magazine's October 2013 issue 14 volume 2, "Masks & Monsters," in an article titled "Devil in the Details." His work consists of mostly endangered species, and he has joined with several conservation groups to promote animal protection and awareness.

References

External links
 Artist's blog

1965 births
Living people
People from Dumont, New Jersey
Guitarists from Maryland
People from Rockville, Maryland
Guitarists from New Jersey
20th-century American guitarists